In geometric dimensioning and tolerancing, a projected tolerance zone is defined to predict the final dimensions and locations of features on a component or assembly subject to tolerance stack-up.

References
ASME Y14.5M-1994 Dimensioning and Tolerancing

American Society of Mechanical Engineers
Technical drawing